Forrest W. Seymour was born July 10, 1905, in South Dakota, and died October 3, 1983, in Dennis, Massachusetts. He was a Pulitzer Prize–winning journalist for the Des Moines Register and Worcester, Massachusetts Telegram. One of his most notable works is Sitanka: The Full Story of Wounded Knee, an account of the massacre, the events leading up to it and the aftermath.

1905 births
1983 deaths
American male journalists
20th-century American journalists
Pulitzer Prize for Editorial Writing winners
20th-century American writers
20th-century American male writers